In the 1971 Intertoto Cup no knock-out rounds were contested, and therefore no winner was declared.

Group stage
Teams from seven countries (West Germany, Sweden, Switzerland, Poland, Czechoslovakia, Austria, and Denmark) participated: four teams from each country. Denmark was the only country that failed to win a group, while West German clubs won two.

Group 1

Group 2

Group 3

Group 4

Group 5

Group 6

Group 7

See also
 1971–72 European Cup
 1971–72 UEFA Cup Winners' Cup
 1971–72 UEFA Cup

External links
  by Pawel Mogielnicki

1971
4